Megamind is an American media franchise created and owned by DreamWorks Animation, which began with the 2010 animated film of the same name written by Alan J. Schoolcraft and Brent Simons. The franchise follows the adventures of a supervillain named Megamind who suddenly gets a chance to defend Metro City from the forces of evil after defeating the now-retired superhero Metro Man.

Feature films

Megamind (2010)
Megamind is a 2010 American computer-animated superhero comedy film directed by Tom McGrath, produced by DreamWorks Animation, and distributed by Paramount Pictures. It features the voices of Will Ferrell, Tina Fey, Jonah Hill, David Cross, and Brad Pitt.

The film tells the story of Megamind, a highly intelligent alien supervillain who becomes depressed after finally defeating his nemesis Metro Man. He creates a new superhero from Metro Man's DNA, but must become a hero himself when the new "hero" becomes a much more dangerous villain than he ever was.

The film was written by Alan J. Schoolcraft and Brent Simons. It was first titled Master Mind, and then Oobermind. It was suggested that Ben Stiller would be cast as Megamind, and later Robert Downey Jr. but Will Ferrell was ultimately given the role, due to "scheduling conflicts" for Downey.

In 2014, the film's distribution rights were purchased by DreamWorks Animation from Paramount Pictures and transferred to 20th Century Fox; the rights are now owned by Universal Pictures.

Short film

Megamind: The Button of Doom (2011)
Megamind: The Button of Doom is a 2011 computer animated short film directed by Simon J. Smith and written by Alan Schoolcraft and Brent Simons, released on DVD/Blu-ray with Megamind on February 25, 2011, starring Will Ferrell and David Cross. Produced by DreamWorks Animation and Pacific Data Images, the short sets after the events of the film to show off Megamind's first day as Defender of Metro City.

Television series

Megamind's Guide To Defending Your City (2024)
On February 11, 2022, it was announced that Peacock had ordered a CG animated series from DreamWorks Animation Television serving as a follow up to the film, titled Megamind’s Guide To Defending Your City. As of April 26, 2022, the cast and format have not been revealed. The series will chronicle the new hero's quest to become a social media influencer and a true superhero. The original writers of the film, Alan Schoolcraft and Brent Simons, are signed on as executive producers with Celebrity Deathmatch creator Eric Fogel. JD Ryznar will be co-executive producer and story editor.

On August 5, 2022, Simons confirmed that the show's writing was completed and production was moving forward.

The series is planned to premiere in 2024.

Cast and crew

Additional crew and production details

Reception

Box office performance

Critical and public response

Video games

Music

Soundtracks

References

External links

Megamind
Mass media franchises introduced in 2010
DreamWorks Animation franchises
Film franchises
Television franchises
American film series
Children's film series